Miller House may refer to:
 Miller House (Fairbanks, Alaska), a former National Register of Historic Places (NRHP) listing in Yukon–Koyukuk Census Area, Alaska 
 Miller House (Little Rock, Arkansas)
 Joaquin Miller House, Oakland, California
 The Abbey-Joaquin Miller House, Oakland, California
 Miller House (Lafayette, Colorado)
 Henry F. Miller House, Orange, Connecticut
 Capt. John Miller House, Eden, Florida
 Lloyd–Bond House or Miller House, Lloyd, Florida
 George McA. Miller House, Ruskin, Florida
 Allan Miller House, Chicago, Illinois
 Miller House (Columbus, Indiana)
 Alvin Miller House, Charles City, Iowa
 F.H. Miller House, Davenport, Iowa
 Severin Miller House, Davenport, Iowa
 Justice Samuel Freeman Miller House, Keokuk, Iowa
 John Andrew Miller House, Georgetown, Kentucky
 William Miller House (Hodgenville, Kentucky), NRHP-listed in LaRue County
 Miller House (Minden, Louisiana), NRHP-listed in Webster Parish
 Edward Miller House, Quincy, Massachusetts
 Isaac Miller House, St. Joseph, Missouri
 Horace Gilbert House, also known as the Morgan and Enos Miller House, Swartz Creek, Michigan
 Harmon Miller House, near Hudson, New York
 Johannes Miller House, Montgomery, New York
 Paschal Miller House, Morristown, New York
 William Starr Miller House, New York City
 Elijah Miller House, North White Plains, New York
 Charles A. Miller House, Cincinnati, Ohio
 Thomas Miller House, near Elizabethtown, Ohio
 Claude Hayes Miller House, Portland, Oregon
 Fred O. Miller House, Portland, Oregon
 Henry B. Miller House, Portland, Oregon
 William Davis Miller House, Wakefield, Rhode Island
 Washington Miller House, Columbia, Tennessee, NRHP-listed in Maury County
 Miller House (Elba, Tennessee)
 Miller House (Houston, Texas), NRHP-listed in Harris County
 Samuel Miller House, Lynchburg, Virginia
 The William Miller House, Richmond, Virginia
 Miller House (Washington, D.C.)
 Joseph S. Miller House, Kenova, West Virginia 
 Miller House (Cooksville, Wisconsin)
 Miller House (Madison, Wisconsin)

See also
 Miller Farm (disambiguation)
 Daniel Miller House (disambiguation)
 George Miller House (disambiguation)
 Henry Miller House (disambiguation)
 Joaquin Miller Cabin, Washington, D.C.
 Miller and Herriott House, Los Angeles, California
 Miller-Blanton House, New Haven, Kentucky, listed on the NRHP in LaRue County
 Miller-Claytor House, Lynchburg, Virginia
 Miller-Cory House, Westfield, New Jersey
 Miller-Kingsland House, Boonton, New Jersey
 Miller-Leuser Log House, Cincinnati, Ohio
 Miller-Mackey House, Lancaster, New York
 Miller-O'Donnell House, Mobile, Alabama
 Miller's House at Red Mills, Shawangunk, New York
 Oliver Miller Homestead, a museum and site of the James Miller House, near Bethel Park, Pennsylvania
 Price-Miller House, Hagerstown, Maryland
 Rush-Miller House, near Smoketown, West Virginia
 Whilldin-Miller House, West Cape May, New Jersey
 William Miller House (disambiguation)